Raimundo Andrés Rebolledo Valenzuela (born 14 May 1997), nicknamed Catuto, is a Chilean footballer who plays as full back for Chilean club Ñublense.

Club career
Rebolledo made his debut at UC in a 2016 Copa Chile match against Santiago Morning.

International career
Along with Chile U20, he won the L'Alcúdia Tournament in 2015.

Rebolledo represented Chile U20 at the South American Youth Football Championship and Chile U23 at the 2020 Pre-Olympic Tournament. In both championships, Chile did not qualify for the second stage.

In February 2020, he was called up to a training microcycle of the Chile senior team.

Career statistics

Club

Honours
Universidad Católica
 Primera División de Chile: 2016–C, 2016–A, 2018, 2019, 2020, 2021
 Supercopa de Chile: 2016, 2019, 2020, 2021

Chile U20
 L'Alcúdia International Tournament (1): 2015

References

External links

1997 births
Living people
Sportspeople from Concepción, Chile
Chilean footballers
Chile under-20 international footballers
Club Deportivo Universidad Católica footballers
Curicó Unido footballers
Chilean Primera División players
Association football fullbacks
21st-century Chilean people